Newby Wiske railway station served the village of Newby Wiske, North Yorkshire, England from 1852 to 1963 on the Leeds-Northallerton Railway.

History 
The station opened on 2 June 1852 by the Leeds Northern Railway. It was situated on the west side of West View. The station originally had one low platform although this was rebuilt along with a second platform when the line was doubled in 1901. The station had full goods yard facilities on the up side of the line, which was accessed from the south. The layout was changed when the line doubled in 1901 with three sidings, two serving a loading dock and the other serving a coal depot. The main goods traffic at the station was barley, with 428 tons being dispatched from it in 1911. Only one wagon of livestock was loaded at the station in 1913. The station was closed due to the First World War on 20 September 1915 but it reopened in April 1920 with only one up train and two down trains. The station was once again closed due to the Second World War on 11 September 1939, although it never reopened. The official date of closure to passengers was on 2 September 1946 and closed to goods traffic on 11 November 1963.

The engine driver managed to stop the train on Maunby Bridge (over the River Swale) some  after the initial derailment. The rear seven detached carriages tore the line up after the locomotive and came to a rest just before the bridge and narrowly avoided falling down the  embankment into the River Swale. A fire broke out in the third carriage caused by a ruptured gas pipe, but it was extinguished by the guard. Of the 160 people aboard the train, only three minor injuries were recorded.

References

External links 

Disused railway stations in North Yorkshire
Former North Eastern Railway (UK) stations
Railway stations in Great Britain opened in 1852
Railway stations in Great Britain closed in 1915
Railway stations in Great Britain opened in 1920
Railway stations in Great Britain closed in 1946
1852 establishments in England
1963 disestablishments in England